Ardinghi is an Italian surname. Notable people with the surname include:

 Angelo Ardinghi (1850–1897), Italian wood engraver
 Massimo Ardinghi (born 1971), Italian tennis player

Italian-language surnames